Pledger is an unincorporated community in Matagorda County, Texas, United States. Pledger has a post office with the ZIP code 77468.

Gallery

References

External links
 

Unincorporated communities in Matagorda County, Texas
Unincorporated communities in Texas